Mudface is the fourth studio album by American rapper Anybody Killa. Released on November 25, 2008, the album featured appearances by Insane Clown Posse, Blaze Ya Dead Homie, Boondox and Strict 9. This like most other albums was recorded at the Lotus Pod, a studio owned by Psychopathic Records. Four Tracks were recorded at Starlight Studios and engineered by Lorne Loulas.

Track listing

Personnel
Anybody Killa – vocals
Boondox  – vocals (5)
Strict 9 – vocals (10)
Insane Clown Posse – vocals (14)

Production
Mitch E. Mitch – (1, 9, 17)
Leonard Contreras – (2, 6, 7, 8, 9, 10, 11, 12, 13, 17)
Native Spirits – (3)
Anybody Killa – (4, 9, 17)
Eric Davie – (5, 14, 15, 16)

References

2008 albums
Anybody Killa albums
Psychopathic Records albums